Vriezenveen is a railway station in Vriezenveen, The Netherlands. The station was opened on 1 October 1906 and is on the single track Mariënberg–Almelo railway. The line is primarily used by school children in the mornings and afternoons. The train services are operated by Arriva.

Train services

Bus services

There is no bus service at this station. The nearest bus stop is De Merel, 15 minutes away (by walking) from the station.

External links
NS website 
Dutch Public Transport journey planner 

Railway stations in Overijssel
Railway stations opened in 1906
Twenterand
1906 establishments in the Netherlands
Railway stations in the Netherlands opened in the 20th century